I Hate Running Backwards is a 2018 shoot 'em up game developed by Binx Interactive and published by Devolver Digital. One or two players traverse procedurally generated levels using several characters, including Sam "Serious" Stone, the protagonist of the Serious Sam series. The screen scrolls vertically as the player character runs backwards through a partially destructible environment and battles enemies approaching from the bottom of the screen. The player can use two weapons, a melee attack, and an "ultimate" ability that requires the prior defeat of several enemies.

I Hate Running Backwards was born out of a mobile driving game presented to and reworked in cooperation with Croteam. As part of the Croteam Incubator programme, it was moved to the Serious Sam franchise and renamed Serious Sam: I Hate Running Backwards, later I Hate Running Backwards. A publishing deal with Devolver Digital was reached in 2017, and the game was released for Windows, PlayStation 4 and Xbox One in May 2018 as the first Croteam Incubator game. The release was followed by a Linux version in June 2018 and a Nintendo Switch port that October.

I Hate Running Backwards was met with a mixed reception. The game's control interface and arsenal were well received, while the visual style and character unlock system raised conflicting opinions. The game's slow pace, repetitiveness, and inconsistencies in difficulty between runs were criticised, although some of these issues were resolved through later patches.

Gameplay 

I Hate Running Backwards is a shoot 'em up game and a spin-off in the Serious Sam series. The screen continuously scrolls vertically, as the player character runs backwards towards the top of the screen. They traverse procedurally generated levels of five thematic environments, occasionally using vehicles. The player can freely move the character on the screen and shoot downwards with a fixed aim.

The character wields two ranged weapons that are fired individually. Running out of ammunition for the primary weapon reverts it to a pistol with unlimited ammunition. Further weapons and special abilities can be obtained through collectables. Using a melee attack, the character can deflect enemies' projectiles and kill nearby enemies. This attack can be used again after a cooldown. A special attack, the "ultimate" ability, requires filling a meter by killing enemies. Enemies approach from the bottom of the screen. A boss appears at the end of each environment, of which the final one, Ugh-Zan, has two phases. Defeating a boss unlocks a shortcut to the next level that can be accessed at the start of a run. After each boss and before the start of a run, the initial weapon loadout can be chosen, where later selection stages provide stronger weapons. Parts of the environment are destructible.

The player chooses from one of several characters, some of whom were taken from the Serious Sam, Broforce, Hotline Miami, Enter the Gungeon, Nuclear Throne and Shadow Warrior franchises, including Serious Sams protagonist, Sam "Serious" Stone. The initial roster consists of three characters, while further are unlocked through in-game progress. All characters have varying weapon loadouts, health, and speed. I Hate Running Backwards can be played cooperatively with a second local player. In this mode, more enemies spawn and bosses have more health. If either player character dies, they respawn after 30 seconds if the other stays alive.

Development and release 
I Hate Running Backwards was developed by Binx Interactive, an indie game studio based in Zagreb. When the studio was founded in 2014, its employees had little knowledge of game development and no funding, wherefore many worked second jobs at other local developers and provided quality assurance to other studios, which often made for 15-hour workdays. Binx Interactive initially created mobile games, of which some were cancelled due to a lack of resources. The studio's debut game was Monster Loops, which it co-developed with the Serbian studio Mad Head Games for iOS.

In 2016, Binx Interactive travelled to the Reboot Develop conference in Split to exhibit Monster Loops. Some members of the studio approached Damjan Mravunac, the composer from Croteam, with a prototype of a mobile driving game. This prototype, created by two Binx Interactive employees in their free time, involved tapping the touchscreen to make a car turn, drift, and spin. Mravunac suggested several changes, which the team delivered three days later. Stemming from this encounter, Binx Interactive and Croteam communicated weekly and, after approximately a month, Croteam suggested that Binx Interactive build a game in the Serious Sam universe. Within a month, the team reworked the game with elements from the Serious Sam franchise and presented a prototype to Croteam, which greenlit the project. By November 2017, Binx Interactive consisted of six full-time employees and one part-time worker. Among them were chief executive officer (CEO) Bernard Bachrach, visual effects artist and designer Filip Kovač, 2D/3D artist and designer Matko Šimecki, programmer Nikola Đurinec, and programmer and co-CEO Denis Mraović, as well as Luka Mihaldinec, who created promotional artwork. The team used the Unity game engine for I Hate Running Backwards.

In 2017, Croteam arranged a publishing deal for the game with Devolver Digital, which had published several of Croteam's previous games, including Serious Sam titles. This partnership was announced with a trailer in August that year. Around this time, the project was named Serious Sam: I Hate Running Backwards, later shortened to I Hate Running Backwards. The name was taken from a quote issued by Sam "Serious" Stone after travelling long distances in reverse. Croteam and Devolver Digital lent Binx Interactive creative control in the development, only sometimes giving advice. In March 2018, Croteam announced that its business incubator programme would be known as Croteam Incubator, with I Hate Running Backwards to be the first release under that banner. A trailer announcing the release date was published in May 2018.

The game was released for Windows, PlayStation 4, and Xbox One on 22 May 2018. A Linux version was postponed for additional testing before being released on 28 June 2018. A port for Nintendo Switch was initially scheduled for "late summer" 2018 and was released on 19 October. The developers also considered bringing the game to iOS. Following the initial release, Binx Interactive released multiple patches for I Hate Running Backwards. In February 2019, the team stated that the development had concluded so that Binx Interactive could focus on future projects.

Reception 

I Hate Running Backwards was named among the best games exhibited at the PAX East trade show by GamesRadar+ in April 2018, a month prior to the game's release. Upon release, the game received "mixed or average reviews", according to the review aggregator website Metacritic, which calculated weighted average ratings of 71/100 for the personal computer release, 63/100 for the PlayStation 4 version, and 65/100 on Xbox One.

Robert Purchese of Eurogamer described the game as a "fun and fast" arcade game, akin to his experience with Broforce. Peter Glagowski of Destructoid commended the simple control interface and fixed line of fire, which he found made the game more navigable. However, he and Julia Gomez of Nintendo World Report faulted the procedural generation, including inconsistent placements of collectables and enemies, for causing difficulty imbalances between runs. Furthermore, Glagowski lamented that the progress required to unlock characters was unclear. In contrast, Gomez considered them a good reward system. Discussing the weaponry, Ángel Llamas of IGNs Spanish outlet highlighted the expansiveness of the available arsenal, while Purchese labelled the individual weapons as "imaginative".

Purchese also enjoyed the "bright" visual style of I Hate Running Backwards. David Hollingworth of PC PowerPlay echoed this sentiment, calling it "chaotic in the all the best ways". Llamas similarly perceived the visuals as chaotic when there were many enemies on-screen.

Critics raised mixed opinions regarding the game's pacing. While Hollingworth and Gomez lauded the ease of repeatedly commencing a run in the game, Llamas considered the game repetitive in longer sessions and regarded it better suited for mobile platforms. Glagowski deemed the game's slow pace its biggest problem and criticised that the shortcuts were not saved between restarts of the game. He later said that several of his complaints, in particular those regarding the pace and shortcuts, were resolved by a patch.

References

External links 
 

2018 video games
Devolver Digital games
Indie video games
Linux games
Nintendo Switch games
PlayStation 4 games
Serious Sam
Shoot 'em ups
Video games developed in Croatia
Video games using procedural generation
Windows games
Xbox One games